Frome is a town and civil parish in eastern Somerset, England. The town is built on uneven high ground at the eastern end of the Mendip Hills, and centres on the River Frome. The population was 28,559 in 2021.

Frome was one of the largest towns in Somerset until the Industrial Revolution, and was larger than Bath from AD 950 until 1650. The town first grew due to the wool and cloth industry; it later diversified into metal-working and printing, although these have declined. The town was enlarged during the 20th century but retains a large number of listed buildings, and most of the centre falls within a conservation area.  In the 2011 census, the population was given as 26,203.

The town has road and rail transport links and acts as an economic centre for the surrounding area. It provides a centre for cultural and sporting activities, including the annual Frome Festival and Frome Museum.

In 2014, Frome was named by The Times the "sixth coolest town" in Britain. It was shortlisted as one of three towns in the country for the 2016 Urbanism Awards in the 'Great Town Award' category. In its 2018 and 2021 report on the "Best places to live in the UK", The Sunday Times listed Frome as the best in the South West. In April 2019, Time Out listed Frome among 15 of the best weekend breaks from London.

History

Prehistoric 

Finds from Whatley Quarry near Mells suggest the presence of late Pleistocene man.

Neolithic bowl barrows have been located in nearby Trudoxhill. At Murtry Hill, just 3 km to the north-west of Frome, a Neolithic long barrow 35m long by 19m wide was located with substantial upright stones (Orchardleigh Stones), a 'chest' burial and cremation urns. Within Frome itself, another long barrow was found, with skeletons, pottery and a standing stone; its structure seemed similar to the Long Kennet barrow. Others from the Bronze Age have been identified in Berkley to the north-east and near Nunney to the south-west.

Iron Age hill forts lie to the west (Kingsdown, Tedbury and Wadbury) and to the east (Cley Hill and Roddenberry).

Roman 
There is some limited evidence of Roman settlement in the area. The remains of a villa were found in the village of Whatley,  to the west of Frome. Another villa is suggested at Selwood. Southill House in Cranmore, 10 miles southwest, has evidence of a villa with a hypocaust. Two villas have been surveyed in the Hemington area,  to the north-west of Frome, alongside other sites, ditches and boundaries. Iron Age forts in the area (recorded above) were re-occupied by the Roman military: Kingsdown and Tedbury.

A Roman road ran from the west of the Mendips passing south of Frome en route to Old Sarum (Salisbury) and Clausentum (Southampton) or to Moriconium (Hamworthy near Poole), probably for the export of lead and silver from mines in the Mendips. Just to the southeast is Friggle Street, suggestive of a Roman road.

The coins were excavated by archaeologists from the Portable Antiquities Scheme, and some are now on display in the British Museum. The find was the subject of a BBC TV programme Digging for Britain in August 2010. A further 250 Dubonnic coins had been found in an urn when ploughing near Nunney in 1860; they included those of Claudius who began the conquest of Britain. Other coins continue to be found in this neighbourhood, both Roman and Byzantine.

Toponymy of 'Frome' 

The name Frome comes from the Brythonic word *frāmā (Modern Welsh ffraw) meaning fair, fine or brisk and describing the flow of the river. In 2019 the BBC ranked Frome as, among places in the UK, having the most difficult name to pronounce.

A church built by St. Aldhelm in 685 is the earliest evidence of Saxon occupation of Frome. Aldhelm was a member of the Wessex royal family, cousin to King Cenwealh. The name was first recorded in 701 when Pope Sergius gave permission to Bishop Aldhelm to found a monastery "close to the river which is called From" (Latin: "juxta fluvium qui vocatur From").
The Saxon kings appear to have used Frome as a base from which to hunt in Selwood Forest. In 934 a witenagemot was held there, indicating that Frome must already have been a significant settlement, with even a royal palace.  The charter names a Welsh sub-king, sixteen bishops and twenty five ministers, all called by Æthelstan, now regarded as the first king of England. Æthelstan's half-brother, King Eadred (son of Edward the Elder), died in Frome on 23 November 955.

Medieval 

At the time of the Domesday Survey, the manor was owned by King William, and was the principal settlement of the largest and wealthiest hundred in Somerset. Over the following years, parts of the original manor were spun off as distinct manors; for example, one was owned by the minster, later passing to the Abbey at Cirencester, which others were leased by the Crown to important families. By the 13th century, the Abbey had bought up some of the other manors (although it did let them out again) and was exploiting the profits from market and trade in the town. Local tradition asserts that Frome was a medieval borough, and the reeve of Frome is occasionally mentioned in documents after the reign of Edward I, but there is no direct evidence that Frome was a borough and no trace of any charter granted to it. However, the Kyre Park Charters of Edward's reign note a Hugh, lord of Parva (or little) Frome, as well as other witnesses. Additionally, Henry VII did grant a charter to Edmund Leversedge, then lord of the manor, giving him the right to hold fairs on 22 July and 21 September. The parish was part of the hundred of Frome.

Hales Castle was built, probably in the years immediately after the Norman conquest of England in 1066. It comprises banks and outer ditches and has an unfinished bailey. At a similar distance to the south-west of Frome stands Nunney Castle, "aesthetically the most impressive castle in Somerset," built from 1373 onwards, surrounded by a moat.

In 1369 there is a record of 'three tuns of woad’ being purchased by Thomas Bakere of Frome, probably from France.  Such a large quantity of the blue dye suggests a well-established trade for local dyers and clothiers.  A 1392 survey of the town mentions tentergrounds: fields of racks for drying the cloth and five fulling mills. Where originally wool was exported to Flanders and Italy, more was increasingly retained at home for the production of cloth.  Woolens such as broadcloth and the lighter kersey became primary products for the area.  Surnames such as Webbe (weaver) or Tayllor appear in the early 14th century and there are explicit references to cloth makers in 1475. By 1470 Somerset was the largest producer after Suffolk, making most of the undyed white broadcloths. The industry had become the town’s principal base of employment.

On 12 April 1477, a widow, Ankarette Twynyho was taken from the manor house known locally as the Old Nunnery in Lower Keyford, accused by George Plantagenet, 1st Duke of Clarence of the murder of Isabel Neville, Duchess of Clarence, who had died in 1476, probably of childbed-fever after birth of a short-lived son. At Warwick, she was charged with "having.....given the Duchess Isabel 'a venomous drink of ale mixed with poison' of which the Duchess has sickened from 10th October to Christmas, when she died. Ankarette protested her innocence, but a packed jury condemned her. She was sentenced and drawn to the gallows.....and hanged all within three hours." Clarence himself was imprisoned in the Tower shortly afterwards and was executed for treason early in 1478. Ankarette's grandson Roger Twynyho received from Edward IV a full posthumous pardon for Ankarette. The petition he submitted to the king later that year describes fully the circumstances of the case, well illustrating the quasi-kingly high-handedness of Clarence.

Monmouth's Rebellion 

On King Charles II's death in February 1685, the Duke of Monmouth, his illegitimate son led the Monmouth Rebellion, landing with three ships at Lyme Regis in Dorset in early June 1685 in an attempt to take the throne from his Catholic uncle, James II. On 25 June 1685, Robert Smith, the constable of Frome declared Monmouth was King in Frome's marketplace, "as confidently as if he had the crown on his head".  Frome was the first locality in England to declare for him.  On 28 June, the forces of Monmouth camped in Frome, following their defeat in a skirmish with the King's forces at Norton St Philip, arriving at 4 o'clock in the morning "very wett and weary". Monmouth is reputed to have stayed in a gabled house in Cork Street, now named the Monmouth Chambers. Whatever discipline he had over his troops vanished as he dallied in Frome, unsure what to do. He left on 30 June for Shepton Mallett. At the Battle of Sedgemoor on 6 July, he was defeated.  Captured on 8 July, he was taken to the Tower of London and executed on 15 July on Tower Hill by Jack Ketch.

At the subsequent ‘Bloody Assizes’ more than 500 rebels were brought in front of the court; out of these, 144 were hanged, drawn and quartered, their remains displayed across the country so that people understood the fate of those who rebelled against the king.  The other rebels were subjected to transportation to America.  In all, 50 Frome men were convicted. 12 men, none of them from Frome, were hanged in the town at Gibbet Hill, Gorehedge.

Rise and fall of the cloth trade 

The manufacture of woollen cloth was established as the town's principal industry in the 15th century. In 1542 during one of his itineraries to observe historic English and Welsh landscapes, Leland described Frome as a town that "hathe a metley good market" and "dyvers fayre stone howsys in the towne that stand y the moste by clothinge". He went on to mention what seems to be Spring Gardens where the Mells River meets the River Frome: clothiers' buildings and fulling mills:  "I cam to a botome, where an other broke ran in to Frome.  And in this botome dwell certayne good clothiuars havynge fayre howsys and tukkynge myles." Frome remained the only Somerset town in which this staple industry flourished.

By the end of 1500s the population was around 3,000.  The trade declined but then revived again as various clothiers changed their products and expanded their business.  The population doubled in size by the mid-1600s, though wages remained low for both weavers and spinners.  From 1665 to 1725 further major expansion occurred, including the building of a new artisans' suburb, now known as the Trinity area, one of the earliest purpose built industrial housing in the country.  The River provided power for a range of mills along its length, dyewood grinding, fulling, dyeing: 10 or more within 2 km of the town. Families of clothiers gradually came to be the principal landowners in the town, with the manor of Frome itself finally passing into the ownership of a cloth merchant in 1714.

In the mid-1720s Daniel Defoe estimated that "Frome is now reckoned to have more people in it, than the city of Bath, and some say, than even Salisbury itself...... likely to be one of the greatest and wealthiest inland towns in England". Poverty, the decline of the wool industry in the mid-18th century, increased industrialisation, and rising food prices led to some unrest amongst the inhabitants of Frome, and there were riots during the century. By 1791, the town was described in less flattering terms than those Defoe had used 50 years earlier. A survey of 1785 listed these occupations: "47 clothiers. 5 dyers, 12 fellmongers, 3 woolstaplers, 54 spinsters, 6 fullers, 146 shearmen, 141 scribblers, 220 weavers, 5 handle setters, 8 twisters, 4 spinning jenny men, for a total of 651 and for the ancillary card making industry 5 cardboard makers, 59 card makers and 23 wire drawers."  These occupations of the cloth trade formed almost half of the heads of household in the town. The Sheppard family, settled in Frome since 1558, became dominant, building new factories, purchasing land and properties, being the first to bring in machinery; the establishment of turnpike roads improved access to markets home and abroad. Scribbling (rough carding), carding, spinning and fly shuttle weaving all became mechanised.

There were several public disturbances throughout this period.  In 1754 a mob of Mendip colliers together with destitute people from Frome protested against the rising cost of flour. A mill and its contents were burned down, others severely damaged. Rioters extorted money from mill owners. Four men were killed when an assault was made on another mill barricaded by the owner and three soldiers. In 1766 a miller in Beckington defended himself against a mob of 2000, firing upon them, wounding some; all of his wheat and flour were seized and fires lit. In 1767, 500 local shearmen assembled and broke up a newly installed spinning jenny in a mill close to Frome.  Among many actions across Somerset and Wiltshire, spinning jennies were smashed in a mill by a mob in 1781. In 1796 a body of Mendip colliers entered the town armed with bludgeons to force local millers to reduce their bread prices. The Constable called for dragoons stationed in the town and they themselves were assaulted. Sabres were drawn and the mob dispersed, bloodied but without fatalities. Afterwards the constable was threatened with arson and murder. At a time of rising unemployment, the price of potatoes provoked a riot in Frome in 1816.  Magistrates read the Riot Act and suppressed the trouble with local militia and dragoons, preventing an attack on a Sheppard factory.

By 1800 the population had increased beyond 12,000. There was a brief boost to the trade from the Napoleonic Wars, Frome supplying blue uniform cloth: 160 miles a year in 1801. As mechanisation increased, fewer skills were required; wages fell along with living conditions. Dyeing ceased. Steam engines replaced water mills.  By 1826 the parish established a blanket factory to employ the poor. A lack of investment locally meant the nation chose to buy the cheaper and lighter cloth produced elsewhere. Many mills closed as the trade steadily declined. Tucker's at Wallbridge, the last fabric mill of 'The Finest West of England Cloth', closed in 1965.

To the present day 

In the early 19th century, plans were developed to reinvigorate the town and once again elevate it to its former position as a more important town than Bath. These plans, the idea of Thomas Bunn, a man of independent means inherited from his father, mostly failed to come to fruition, although some public buildings were erected and a wide new approach road to the town centre from the south was cut (named Bath Street after the landowner, Lord Bath of Longleat House).

Whilst wool remained an important part of the town's economy into the 19th (and even 20th) centuries, other industries were established in the town. A bell-foundry started in 1684 by William Cockey grew to be a major producer of components for the developing gas industry and employer of 800 people, as a new enterprise of his descendant, Edward Cockey The J W Singer brass foundry and bronze-casting works, was a major employer and produced bronze statues. John Webb Singer was born in Frome and established his art metal work foundry in 1851. They made brass ornaments for local churches and became known through the Oxford Movement within the Church of England which led to increasing demand for church ornaments. In addition to church ornaments the firm developed new facilities, opened as the Frome Art Metalworks in 1866, and then the expertise to create large statues. One of the first statues cast in 1889 was that of General Gordon riding a camel. The firm was responsible for the bronze statue of Boudica with her daughters in her war chariot (furnished with scythes after the Persian fashion), which was commissioned by Prince Albert and executed by Thomas Thornycroft. It was unveiled in 1902, 17 years after Thornycroft's death, and now stands next to Westminster Bridge and the Houses of Parliament, London. The statue of Lady Justice on the dome above the Old Bailey was executed by the British sculptor, F. W. Pomeroy and cast by Singers. The statue of Alfred the Great at Winchester was a further commission. The statues from Singers have been exported around the world. Printing was another major industry, with the Butler and Tanner printworks being set up in the middle of the century. Brewing was another source of employment.

Utility services came quite early in Frome with Cockey setting up a gas facility in Welshpool in 1831.  Water was available from springs; the principal source was from a fountain at the foot of Church Steps, fed by stream that flowed under the graveyard. It was not until 1880, after a local company failed to deliver, that local government stepped in and opened a Water Works with a piped supply system.  A sewage farm was not installed until 1885. It was 1903 before mains electricity was introduced into the town.

In World War I a large number of men from Frome and the surrounding villages enlisted.  The Somerset Infantry was the primary recruiter; other county regiments from around Somerset took in many others. Some born in Frome joined up in the country they had emigrated to: Australia and Canada.  The Royal Navy, the Royal Flying Corps, the British Red Cross and the Royal Army Medical Corps all took in volunteers and conscripts, as did multiple different regiments from across the UK. Over 450 lives, ranging from a brigadier-general to scores of privates and able seamen, were lost in the conflict, now recorded on memorials throughout the area and elsewhere. A record of more than 140 local survivors of WWI has been published. These survivors included Charlie Robbins who was the model for the bronze statue forged by the Singer company which now stands as the memorial for the fallen of Frome.

The population fell and in the 1930s it was slightly smaller than it had been in the mid 19th century. Other industries such as printing, light engineering, metal casting, carpeting and dairying continued, many taking old premises from the cloth mills and others being sited at the new Marston Road Trading Estate which led to growth after World War II, including the construction of council houses.

Governance and public services

Local government 

The town elects three members to Somerset County Council, each from a separate county division. At the last election in May 2017, the Green Party won in two divisions (East and West) and the Conservatives won Frome North.

Frome is the largest town within the Somerset non-metropolitan district of Mendip, although the administrative centre is Shepton Mallet. Prior to 1974 it was administered by Frome Urban District. Frome has eleven councillors on Mendip District Council, two from each of the town council wards except for Oakfield, which elects one. After the 2019 elections, five were Liberal Democrats, four for The Green Party, one for the Conservatives and one elected as an Independent.

The civil parish of Frome has adopted the style of a town, and there is a Town Council of 17 members. Councillors are elected by eight wards: three each for Berkley Down, college and Keyford wards, two each for Market, Oakfield and Park wards, and one each for the Highpoint and Innox wards. In May 2019 all 17 council members elected were members of the Independents for Frome party (ifF).

Initiatives
In early 2015, the UK's first high street Library of Things was set up in the town. In one year (May 2018 to April 2019), use of the shop helped avoid 92 tonnes CO2e of greenhouse gas emissions, saved 117,000 kg of material usage and avoided 10 tonnes of manufacturing waste. In the same period its members collectively saved £66,800 by borrowing instead of buying items.

The Town Council installed the first community fridge in the country in May 2016; 90,000 items a year have been saved from landfill. This was joined by a community larder in October 2017.

On 13 December 2017 the Town Council unanimously agreed to become a 'single-use plastic'-free council.

Frome has an online market, the Food Hub launched in November 2018, where sustainable supplies from local farmers and food producers can be sourced, either for collection or by delivery (central Frome only).

There are a number of public green spaces within the town, both formal and informal; some are substantial such as the Victoria Park or the Rodden Meadow; others may be smaller but are valued within their neighbourhoods, such as Weylands or the Dippy. Many of the public spaces have organised litter picks, arranged by local community groups.

Parliament 

The town was not represented in Parliament until given one member in the House of Commons by the Reform Act of 1832. The constituency elected a female MP in 1934: Mavis Tate. Separate representation was abolished for the 1950 general election, with Frome itself being transferred to the Wells division, whilst most of the remainder of the constituency formed the bulk of the new Somerset North constituency. Further changes took place for the 1983 general election when the current Somerton and Frome constituency was created.

The seat has been held by Conservative Member of Parliament (MP) David Warburton since 2015. At the 2017 general election, with an improved turnout of 75.7%, Warburton increased his share of the vote to 56.7%.

Reform Act violence 
Frome was given the right to elect its own member of Parliament, one of 67 new constituencies, by the Reform Act 1832. This Act removed rotten boroughs like Old Sarum (with three houses and seven voters to elect two MPs) and included for the first time new electors such as small landowners, tenant farmers and shopkeepers; voters were defined as male persons, so women were formally excluded.

The election was disputed by two well-known local men: Sir Thomas Champneys and Thomas Sheppard, a Tory and a Radical or Whig respectively. There was no serious trouble until the election itself. The two were personal enemies, with a long history of property dealings between their families over 180 years. Champneys, the second baronet, may have been popular but he was disreputable, his Orchardleigh Estate in decline and in debt. In 1820 Sheppard had been a key witness when Sir Thomas was accused of sodomy; the case was not proven.

Voting at that time was in person in public, the hustings taking place in Cork Street just off the Market Place.  The Frome county constituency area included Weston, Radstock, Bathampton, Batheaston as well as freeholders in Bath; there were only 322 registered voters.  On the first day, 10 December, Champneys arrived with hundreds of men and boys, many armed with lead-loaded bludgeons and cudgels. They attacked Sheppard's supporters. Thomas Bunn, a local man of property, recollected what he saw:

Sheppard arrived, backed by 500 men, all said to be unarmed.

A Sheppard supporter, Thomas Ford was badly injured and died later. Special constables were sworn in by the magistrates in the George Inn. The mob besieged the building and smashed the windows. Sheppard retreated to his home, Fromefield House, guarded by 300 men. Dragoons were brought from Trowbridge to neighbouring Beckington.

Early on the second day, Sheppard had gained 163 votes, more than half of those entitled to vote. Shouting 'Champneys for ever', the opponents attacked the Crown Inn trying to get at Sheppard in the George Inn next door. A draper's house was completely destroyed.  Several constables were stoned and injured.  The Riot Act was read. Constables with carbines opened fire. At 3 in the afternoon the Dragoons arrived and the battle was halted. Having won 100 votes to Sheppard's 163, Champneys resigned and returned to Orchardleigh. Thomas Sheppard won the next three elections and remained Frome's MP until 1847.

One notable successor of Sheppard was elected in 1868: Thomas Hughes, author of Tom Brown's School Days, as a Liberal under Gladstone.

Healthcare 
The town has a National Health Service community hospital, originally operated by Somerset Primary Care Trust, located on the site of the former Showground at Fromefield. The new hospital was opened in 2008, replacing the former Frome Victoria Hospital in Park Road which had been in use since 1901. The nearest general hospital is the Royal United Hospital in Bath.

Compassionate Frome is a programme to combat loneliness amongst residents, pioneered by a local GP, Helen Kingston, in 2013. It proved very successful and reduced emergency hospital admissions by 17% over three years when in the rest of the county they rose by 29%, even though demographics were similar. "There are no other interventions which have ever reduced population emergency admissions like this", said one doctor. The programme's success has been credited in part with attracting an influx of middle-class newcomers to the town. Frome is "at the vanguard" of a growing movement to better incorporate nonclinical solutions into medical care, according to one doctor. Since 2016 there has been an effort to role out the scheme across the entire Mendip area.

Geography 

The town rests on Forest Marble which dates back to the Middle Jurassic, and has been used for local building. The area surrounding the town is Cornbrash, Oxford Clay and Greensand. Frome is unevenly built on high ground above the River Frome, which is crossed by a bridge in the town centre.

The main areas of the town are (approximately clockwise from the north-west): Innox Hill, Welshmill, Packsaddle, Fromefield, Stonebridge, Clink, Berkley Down, Easthill, Wallbridge, The Mount, Keyford and Lower Keyford, Marston Gate, The Butts, Critchill, Trinity, and Gould's Ground.

When Frome was founded in the 7th century AD, it lay in the centre of the Selwood Forest, Saxon Sealhwudu or 'Sallow Wood', also known as Coit Mawr, Great Wood, by the Welsh. It stretched from Gillingham in Dorset to Chippenham in Wiltshire, from Bruton to Warminster.  It served as a boundary between Anglo-Saxon Wessex and the British kingdom of Dumnonia in the west.  In 1086 it became a royal forest. Gradually deforestation took place. Frome was often called Frome Selwood. Today the nearby countryside is still richly wooded, for example on the Longleat, Maiden Bradley and Stourhead estates. Around the town the land is predominantly agricultural, with arable cropping, dairy farming and orchards. To the west of the town, on the edge of the Mendip Hills, there are large active limestone quarries, such as Whatley Quarry and Torr Works, formerly known as Merehead, along with disused quarries. Whatley Quarry is served by a dedicated railway line which branches off the main line at Frome, passes through the town centre and out through the Welshmill and Spring Gardens areas in the north-west quadrant of the town.

Along with the rest of South West England, Frome has a temperate climate which is generally wetter and milder than the rest of England. The annual mean temperature is about 10 °C (50 °F) with seasonal and diurnal variations, but due to the modifying effect of the sea, the range is less than in most other parts of the United Kingdom. January is the coldest month with mean minimum temperatures between 1 °C (34 °F) and 2 °C (36 °F). July and August are the warmest months in the region with mean daily maxima around 21 °C (70 °F). In general, December is the dullest month and June the sunniest. The south west of England enjoys a favoured location, particularly in summer, when the Azores High extends its influence north-eastwards towards the UK.

Cloud often forms inland, especially near hills, and reduces exposure to sunshine. The average annual sunshine totals around 1600 hours. Rainfall tends to be associated with Atlantic depressions or with convection. In summer, convection caused by solar surface heating sometimes forms shower clouds and a large proportion of the annual precipitation falls from showers and thunderstorms at this time of year. Average rainfall is around 800–900 mm (31–35 in). About 8–15 days of snowfall is typical. November to March have the highest mean wind speeds, with June to August having the lightest. The predominant wind direction is from the south west.

Demography 

The population of Frome was 12,240 in the 1831 census, however it then declined to 11,057 in 1901 and remained between 11,000 and 12,000 until the 1970s. Since then, it has increased, nearly doubling to over 23,000 in 1991. In the 2011 census, the population was 26,203, comprising 11,863 (48.4%) males and 12,647 (51.6%) females. 7,674 (31.3%) residents were aged 16 or below, 13,150 (63.3%) between 16 and 65, and 3,686 (15.0%) aged 65 or over.

In the 2001 census of the population aged between 16 and 74, 11,580 (67%) were in employment, with only 513 (3%) unemployed (the remainder being otherwise economically inactive). About 68% of those in employment were in service industries, with the remainder in manufacturing. 4,323 people were employed in managerial or professional occupations, 1,362 were self-employed, and 4,635 in routine and semi-routine occupations. 10,198 households were recorded in the town, of which 7,679 (75%) were owner-occupied, 981 (10%) rented from private landlords, and 1,538 (15%) rented from the local authority or other social landlord. 10,122 (99.3%) heads of households were white.

Economy 

The metal-working and printing industries which replaced wool as Frome's main industry have declined but not left the town. Singers still has a presence in the town, as does Butler and Tanner, although the latter (now named Butler Tanner and Dennis following a take-over) hit major financial difficulties in 2008, and made two-thirds of its workforce redundant.

Almost half of the economically active population of Frome commute to work outside the town (in Bath, Bristol, Warminster, Westbury or further afield). About 2,700 people commute into the town. A substantial part of the workforce has no formal qualifications and is poorly skilled, leaving them vulnerable to a decline in manufacturing work. There is no major local government employment in the town, and the principal public sector employers are the primary care trust and the schools.

Frome town centre contains a considerable number of independent shops, and a few chain stores. Retail is primarily aimed at serving the local population's requirements for food (there are two large supermarkets on opposite edges of the town, and three smaller supermarkets in the town centre), basic clothing, health and beauty, DIY and some electrical goods. However studies show that only about a quarter of the town's population do their non-food shopping in the town. Banks and building societies have branches in the town centre.

Markets are held on Wednesdays and Saturdays in the town centre: some in the Market Yard car park, and others in the former agricultural warehouse, the Cheese and Grain. From March to December, on the first Sunday of each Monday, a street market known as 'The Independent' is held. Attended by an average of 10,000 people, the main street is closed to traffic; it is filled with stalls that extend up Stony Street and St Catherine's Hill and to the main car park. Antiques, artisan wares, food and drink, designer & vintage clothing, plants fill the 150+ stalls. The Saturday cattle market was moved from the centre of the town to nearby Standerwick in the 1980s. In 2003, Frome was granted Fairtrade Town status.

A Vision for Frome 2008–2028 has been developed following a consultation with local people in the spring of 2008 which received over 3,000 responses. Mendip District Council and Mendip Strategic Partnership have consulted on a Community Strategy and Local Development Framework for the period to 2026 which includes building 2,500–2,600 new homes, providing more employment and office space, developing a new secondary school and two new primary schools, remodelling the town centre and encouraging a wider range of retailers and leisure providers into the town.

There have been a number of significant housing developments within Frome, many on former industrial sites, and these are continuing with plans for the redevelopment of a site at Saxonvale and Garsdale to include several hundred dwellings, shops and a 'cultural quarter' containing workshops for artists. In August 2018 Mendip District Council purchased two areas of Saxonvale, neglected for over twenty years. Combining this with land belonging to Frome Town Council, a new regeneration plan has been drawn up, now under public consultation.

Culture 

Frome has a vibrant arts scene. The high-point is the annual ten-day Frome Festival in July, which in recent years has included more than 160 events held at various venues in and around the town. The town is host to a number of artists, many of whom open their studios to the public during the Festival. The event includes a Children's Festival.

There are a variety of cultural & community events that have become regular features of the town's life throughout the year: the Window Wonderland (early March), Frome Busks (late March), Apple Day (21 October), Fireworks (November) and Light the Night: lanterns and the Christmas Lights switch-on (late November). The Carnival (September) is part of the Wessex Grand Prix circuit of the West Country Carnival. A national Town Crier festival is held each year in June; for the third year running, it is the largest such festival in Britain, hosting 25 town criers.

There are two theatres in Frome: The Memorial Theatre was built in 1924 in memory of the fallen of the World War I, while the 240-seat Merlin Theatre is part of the Frome Community College campus.
Frome is home to Somerset's first and only pub theatre: Nevertheless, Productions, which promotes new drama in small venues around the town. The Cheese and Grain, a former farm produce warehouse which was converted into a market and concert hall in 1997, has a capacity of up to 800 and hosts regular pop concerts. Locally based musicians include American saxophonist Alfred "Pee Wee" Ellis and Irish folk singer Cara Dillon as well as hardcore punk bands More Than Life, Ghost of the Avalanche and Landscapes. On Friday, 24 February 2017, the Foo Fighters played a secret intimate show at the Cheese and Grain venue to announce their Glastonbury 2017 Pyramid Stage headlining slot on the Saturday night of the festival.

Frome's only cinema, the Westway, is in Cork Street in the town centre, which closed in March 2016 and re-opened February 2017, after changing hands and undergoing extensive refurbishment. A fire at the cinema in October 2016 was thought to have been started deliberately. There is an arts centre, The Black Swan, within which the information point for Discover Frome is based.

The Frome & District Agricultural Society holds an annual Agricultural & Cheese Show in September. This was formerly held on the Showground at Fromefield, but in recent years has moved to West Woodland,  to the south of the town. Early markets were known as cheese fairs; the Agricultural Society was formed in 1861 and held its first fair. In 1875 the creation of the Market Hall (now the Cheese and Grain) and of a railway siding into the Cattle Market (now the main car park) established Frome as a cheese town – one sale alone recorded 28½ tons of Cheddar.

The Frome Society for Local Study was founded in 1958 to make the history of Frome and the district better known, and to preserve its historic buildings and records; there is an annual programme of winter lectures and summer visits to places of interest as well as a wide range of research, donations, and publications. It has funded plaques across the town, to mark significant buildings and prominent persons. The Frome Museum has a particular important collection of artefacts from Singer's bronze foundry and houses a rolling display of local history including a Cockey lamp and shop contents.  The library and archive is open to researchers by appointment throughout the year.

Frome is served by two newspapers, the Frome & Somerset Standard and the Frome Times, the latter now has the third largest circulation in the county. In 2008, a 'not for profit' company called Frome Community Productions was formed by members of the community in order to develop and deliver FromeFM, an internet based community radio station. The station broadcasts 24 hours per day and is completely staffed by volunteers who produce features, interviews and music shows. In 2009, FromeFM commenced a service to stream the broadcasts to mobile phones. In late 2011 FromeFM was granted a broadcast licence and on 16 July 2012 began broadcast on 96.6FM in the Frome area. FromeTV, was another 'non-profit' organisation running an online TV station.

Frome is home to the Frome Writers Collective – a not for profit organization. Its patron is Barry Cunningham OBE.

Frome's Cheap Street is a location in episode six of the first series of BBC TV comedy The Fall and Rise of Reginald Perrin. Frome has provided the backdrop to historical dramas, such as Poldark, broadcast in 2016 which has regular scenes shot in Gentle Street, with a further shoot in December 2018 and Drover's Gold, filmed by BBC Wales in 1996. Catherine Hill, in the town centre, was the setting for the 2016 short film Lucky Chicken by Gulliver Moore which is available on YouTube.

Aside from a thriving café culture, there is a wide range of restaurants in Frome. A selection includes the Archangel, formerly the Angel, the oldest inn in the town, which has an eclectic menu, as do the Fat Radish or the Stony Street House; others include menus that are French (Bistro Lotte), Thai (Thai Kitchen), vegetarian (Garden Café), vegan (The Good Heart), vegan friendly (Nook), Mediterranean (The High Pavement), Italian (Castello), even a tiny Southern Indian take-away (Lungi Babas).

Landmarks 

The older parts of Frome – for example, around Sheppard's Barton and Catherine Hill – are picturesque, containing an outstanding collection of small late-17th- and 18th-century houses. The Trinity area, which was built in the latter half of the 17th century and first half of the 18th, is a fine (and rare) example of early industrial housing.  More than 300 houses were built between 1660 and 1756 in an unusual early example of a planned grid pattern. Although about half the area was demolished in the 1960s under a Slum Clearance Order, before its historical importance was realised; the remainder was saved and was restored at a cost of £4 million between 1980 and 1984. In this area is the elaborate former Selwood Printing Works. Stony Street, which leads into Catherine Hill, is a steep, cobbled road climbing out of the town centre. In the centre of the town, Cheap Street contains buildings dating to the 16th and 17th centuries and has a stream running down the middle fed by the spring at St John's Church. Cheap Street has never been used for vehicular traffic and its layout is based on land plots dating to approximately 1500. Despite a fire in 1923 the buildings have remained substantially unchanged since 1830, apart from shop-frontages.

The bridge in the centre of the town over the River Frome was rebuilt and widened in 1821, at which time a terrace of houses was built along one side of it. It is one of only three bridges in England that carry buildings; the others are Pulteney Bridge in Bath and the High Bridge in Lincoln. The Tourist Information Centre in Justice Lane is contained within a circular dye-house known to have been in existence by 1813, one of two surviving in the town (the other being in Willow Vale). It was restored in 1994. In the 1990s and early years of the 21st century, Frome benefited from considerable investment in the restoration of its historic buildings through the English Heritage Heritage Economic Regeneration Scheme and the National Lottery Townscape Heritage Initiative.

Frome has 370 listed buildings, the greatest number within Somerset, outside of Bath. Individual buildings are best examined through Historic England's listings. Three of these (including the parish church) are Grade I listed. The Blue House, next to the town bridge, is another; it was formerly the Bluecoat School and Almshouses, named after the colour of the school uniforms. Built in 1726 at a cost of £1,401 8s 9d, it replaced an almshouse dating from 1461 and rebuilt in 1621. The Blue House provided a home for twenty widows and schooling for twenty boys. The front of the building is adorned by two statues, of a man and a woman, indicating the building's dual purpose. The building's role as a school came to an end in 1921 and it now provides studio and one-bedroom flats for seventeen elderly residents.

Rook Lane Chapel was a nonconformist chapel built between 1705 and 1707 by James Pope: "The size and pride of the building are remarkable at so early a date." The chapel had a gallery around three sides and the centre of the ceiling was domed and supported by two Tuscan columns. Rook Lane ceased to be used as a chapel in 1968 and there followed twenty-five years of neglect. In the early 1990s the building was compulsorily purchased by Somerset County Council and transferred to the Somerset Buildings Preservation Trust, which carried out repairs and restorations. In 2001 it was converted by a firm of architects, the ground floor becoming a community hall and arts centre managed by Rook Lane Arts Trust and the galleried upper floor becoming offices for the architectural firm NVB Architects.

Frome is reputed to have one or more systems of tunnels beneath the streets of the older parts of the town. Some entrances are visible above ground; for example in the wall at the top of Stony Street, with other entrances in the cellars of shops and houses. Their purpose and full extent remain unknown but they have been investigated in recent years by at least one local group and a documentary has been made.

Merchants Barton, in the Saxonvale area east of St John's church, dates to circa 1785, the approximate date of the Silk Mill or Thompson's Mill. It is a passageway used by workers and employees of the textile crepe and silk industry that set up factories and mills in Saxonvale during the early eighteenth century. When these closed in 1925, an engineering company from Cardiff called Notts Industries settled in the lower part of Saxonvale and Bussmann Cooper, an American fuse manufacturer, took ownership of the upper part.  During the mid-20th century, up to 300 mostly female workers in the engineering and fuse factories who walked to and from work along the Merchants Barton were referred to locally as the 'Bussmann Girls'.

One of Frome's most ancient and unregarded structures, the Old Town Wall, runs along from Bath Street through into upper Saxonvale below Lidl, whilst the Old Slaughterhouse facade with its blocked-in coach arches and mixture of dressed and rubble stone sections is architecturally of significance in assessing the surviving fabric of previous barton buildings.

Religious sites 

The parish church of St John the Baptist, was built between the late 12th century and early 15th century replacing a 685 AD Saxon building. Major restoration work was carried out in the 1860s, including the construction of the Via Crucis, which is thought to be unique in an Anglican church. Outside the east end of the church is the tomb of Bishop Thomas Ken. The tower has eight bells, which bear inscriptions indicating that they were cast at various points between 1622 and 1792. A daughter church of St John's, Christ Church, was built in 1818 by George Allen Underwood, although considerable changes were made throughout the 19th and 20th centuries. St Mary's Church at Innox Hill was built in 1862–1864 to the designs of C.E. Giles as a chapel of ease to St John's; it is small with a decorated sanctuary ceiling. The Anglican Church of the Holy Trinity was built in 1837–38 by Henry Goodridge in the style of Commissioners' Gothic. It is unusual in that the altar is at the west end due to the position in which the church was built. The stained glass windows are near-contemporary copies of windows designed by Sir Edward Burne-Jones.

In 1853, Irvingite Catholics (Catholic-Apostolic) began worshipping in a building in the West End until the church was closed. Nevertheless, there was a St Catherine's Catholic Church conducting weddings in Frome in 1904. The Roman Catholic church began in Frome after the building of a temporary church in Park Road in 1928, and a new church, St Catharine's Catholic Church, was finally built on the site in 1967 and 1968. Rook Lane Chapel, a noncomformist chapel, was in use from 1707 until 1968. In 1773, a split in the congregation of Rook Lane led to the establishment of another Zion Congregational Church in Whittox Lane. This building was replaced in 1810, and was extended in 1888 (a separate, octagonal school room with a conical roof having been built on the grounds in 1875). A Quaker Meeting House existed in Sheppards Barton, now South Parade, from 1675 to 1856. The original building was replaced around 1730 with a simple unadorned stone building comprising a single meeting room with wrought iron gallery above. The building became a school, the town library, Red Cross centre and, since 1999, the offices of a software company. The present chapel-like appearance was created in a 1993 refurbishment by the Red Cross.

Baptists had been worshipping in the town since 1669, and had two churches. One was built in Sheppards Barton (now South Parade) in 1708. This was demolished and replaced by a new building in 1850, which was itself closed in 2001. Part of this building was converted to residential use but the main church, with a baptism pool, remains disused. A second Baptist Church was built in Badcox Lane (now Catherine Street) in 1711. It was replaced with a new building in 1813, which was embellished with a Doric portico in 1845. It closed in 1962 (later serving as a library, before being converted into flats in the 1980s). The Methodist church, built in 1812 at Gorehedge, is still in use after considerable additions in 1863, restoration in 1871 and major internal rearrangement in the 1980s. Sun Street Chapel was erected by the Primitive Methodists in 1834, and closed in 1982, although it was used by another religious group afterwards. It is now used as a Community Centre. There is another Methodist church on Portway, built in 1910. A Dissenters' Cemetery with Chapel at Vallis Road, was founded in 1851 by Frome's 'Free Churches', mainly Baptist, Congregational and Methodist, and has been the site of over 6,000 burials.

Transport 

Frome is served by the Heart of Wessex Line which passes the eastern edge of the town. Frome station was opened in 1850 and is one of the oldest railway stations still in operation in Britain, now with direct services to Bristol Temple Meads, Exeter St Davids, Weymouth and London Paddington. Trains are operated by Great Western Railway. A freight line, which branches off through the town to serve the quarries on the Mendip Hills, is mainly used by Mendip Rail; Freightliner took over the line in November 2019. A continuation of this line, which previously linked Frome to Radstock, is now the route of National Cycle Route 24, otherwise known as the Colliers Way.

Frome is served by a number of bus routes, the busiest being the D2 First West of England service to Bath, followed by the X67 and X34 services run by Faresaver of Chippenham. Other companies running bus services in Frome include FromeBus and Libra Travel.

The A361 bypasses the town around the southern and eastern edges, while the A362 passes through the centre of the town from north-west to south-east. Frome is about 26 miles (41 km) southeast of the M4 motorway at junction 18 (Bath).

The Town Council employs a resilience officer, one of only two at town council or parish level in the country; a principal task is to support the strategic priorities for transport. Initiatives include a public-access car club, operated by the social enterprise Co-wheels. Electric charging points are available at the Cheese and Grain, the Town Hall, the Football Club and Frome Medical Practice.

Education 

Frome has thirteen first schools for pupils aged between 4 and 9 years, including Berkley Church of England First School, Christ Church Church of England First School, Hayesdown First School, St John's Church of England Voluntary Aided First School, St Louis Catholic Primary School, Trinity Church of England First School and Vallis First School.

There are two middle schools for pupils between 9 and 13 years of age: Oakfield Academy and Selwood Anglican/Methodist Middle School. The town's main college, Frome Community College, provides education between ages 13 and 18, and has specialist "media arts" status. Critchill School is a special school catering to students who have special educational needs and Farleigh Further Education College is for special needs students aged 16 to 25 with Asperger syndrome and associated conditions.

There are no further or higher education establishments in Frome, the closest third-level institution being the University of Bath. Somerset Skills & Learning, which provides apprenticeships and training for young people and adults, has a site in the town.

Sport and leisure 

The Leisure Centre offers a wide range of activities including swimming, indoor bowls, squash and a gym, originally opened in 1974, and refurbished through October 2015 to May 2016. There are water based sports including the Frome and Warminster Dive Club, and Canoe Club. There is an inland diving centre near Frome at Vobster.

Victoria Park offers sports such as Bowls, Tennis, Putting, Skateboard ramps and a Children's Playground. The Millennium Green has several marked walks and a picnic area close to a semi wild open space for local wildlife.

Badgers Hill is the home of Frome Town F.C., which in 2009 was promoted from the Western Football League into the Southern Football League. The team were promoted again in 2011 into the Southern Football League Premier Division. The Frome Town ladies' team also play at Badgers Hill. Frome Town F.C. has Youth/Mini section, launched in the 2010–11 season, which achieved FA Community Club Status in 2012. The Youth section covers players of all abilities from under 6's to under 18's. Starting in September 2019, the Frome Town 'Education and Football Academy' (part of a Southern League Football Academy) will offer the BTEC in Sport Level 3 qualification.

Frome Cricket Club plays cricket at the Agricultural Showgrounds on the Bath side of town. The club was formed in 1925 and plays in the West of England Premier League: Somerset Division. Somerset County Cricket Club used to use the ground and Harold Gimblett made his debut at the venue in May 1935. The club's most famed players are Colin Herbert Dredge, who played county cricket 209 times for Somerset from 1976 to 1988 and was known as the "Demon of Frome", Mark Harmon, who played for both Somerset and Kent and still plays for Frome Cricket Club and Alex Barrow, who played for Somerset, represented England at under 19 level and is now a player/coach for Exeter Cricket Club.

Founded in 1883, Frome Rugby Football Club has been at the very heart of Rugby Union in Somerset playing at Gypsy Lane. It has four senior teams and a thriving mini and junior section which ranges from Under 6's to Under 16's along with an Academy XV. The First XV, Second XV and Third XV all play in the English Rugby Union South West Division Championship; the First XV play in Wadworth 6X Southern Counties South league, the Second XV in Wadworth 6X Dorset & Wilts 2 North and the Third XV in The Bath Merit Table. The Fourth XV Veterans, known as the Cavalry, and the Fourth XV Academy play friendly, social fixtures against other local sides.

Two cycling clubs operate in the town: the Frome CTC, nicknamed the Coffee and Tea-Cake Club, and the Frome & District Wheelers. E-bikes are available for hire, courtesy of a Town Council initiative.

The Frome Cobble Wobble, is an individually timed bicycle hill climb sprint. It was first organised by the local community and Councillor Alvin Horsfall to celebrate the stage 5 of the 2009 Tour of Britain, which started in Frome.  The last race was in 2012.

The Guinness World Record for the most people to row 500m each, in a 24-hour relay on one indoor rowing machine, was held in Frome when 678 rowers broke the record in June 2018. A new record was achieved in June 2019 for the highest number of players in a continuous eight-hour game of skittles, 593 individuals taking place, beating the previous record of 468. Both of these events raised money for a local charity, We Hear You. Unfortunately this latest record will not be verified by Guinness as there was no video recording of the event.

The Frome Half Marathon has taken place every year since 2001, in mid-July.  It includes 10k, 5k and Family Fun Runs.

Frome is an accredited Walkers are Welcome town since 2018.  An extensive list of walks and guides is available. Guided walks on a range of topics are now online. The East Mendip Way passes through Frome and gives access to an 80-kilometre (50 mi) long-distance footpath across the Mendip Hills.

Notable people 

 Benjamin Baker, builder of the Forth Bridge, was born in Frome in 1840 and is commemorated by a Frome Society for Local Study plaque.
 Charles Ball, founder of Ball & Welch department store chain in Australia.
 The Formula One racing driver and 2009 world champion Jenson Button was born in Frome in 1980. He went to Selwood Middle School, now Selwood Academy, in Frome. A street, Jenson Avenue, has been named after him, as has a new bridge over the River Frome 'The Jenson Button Bridge'. In May 2010, Button was awarded freedom of the town.
 Cara Dillon, Irish folk singer, and her husband, musician and record producer Sam Lakeman (brother of Seth Lakeman), have lived in Frome since 2002.
 The cricketer Colin Dredge was born in Frome in 1954.
 Edward Cockey (1781–1860) established an iron foundry and brought gas to Frome.  He was born, worked and died in Frome.
 Eadred (or Edred) (923–955), King of England between 944 and 955, died in Frome on 23 November of that year.
 Alfred "Pee Wee" Ellis (1941–2021, born in Bradenton, Florida), saxophonist, composer and arranger, lived in Frome.
 Eva Elwes (1876–1950), actress and playwright, born in Frome.
 Anna Friel, actress.
 Wilfred Dolby Fuller (1893–1947), English recipient of the Victoria Cross, worked as a local policeman and died in Frome.
 The philosopher Joseph Glanvill was Vicar of Frome from 1662 to 1666.
 Danny Goffey, drummer with the band Supergrass, lives in Frome.
 Clara Grant (1867–1949), educational pioneer and social reformer, lived in Frome in her youth.
 Guy Green, film director, screenwriter, and cinematographer, who won an Oscar for Great Expectations in the last category, was born at 4 Portway in Frome in 1913.
 Alice Seeley Harris, pioneering documentary photographer, missionary and human rights activist, born in Frome in 1870. Commemorated by Frome Society for Local Study plaque.
 John Harris, journalist, writer and critic, lives in Frome.
 Charlie Higson of The Fast Show was born in Frome in 1958.
 Gary Joyce (born 1964), cricketer
 Simon King, naturalist and broadcaster, has a business in the town.
 David Lassman, author, journalist and scriptwriter has lived in Frome since 2011.
 Actor James Laurenson lives in the town.
 Pearl Lowe, English fashion and textiles designer, lives in Frome.
 Lois Maxwell, who played Miss Moneypenny in the James Bond film series from 1962 to 1985, lived in Frome from 1994 to 2001. Commemorated by Frome Society for Local Study plaque.
 Huey Morgan, American lead singer/guitarist from Fun Lovin' Criminals and radio presenter on BBC Radio 6 Music & BBC Radio 2 lived in Frome until 2018.
 Sir Charles Oatley, developer of one of the first commercial scanning electron microscopes, was born at 5 Badcox in Frome in 1904. Commemorated by Frome Society for Local Study plaque.
Parfitt Brothers, architects in Brooklyn, New York
 Anthony Powell, author, died in Frome in 2000.
 William Henry "Billy" Reed, violinist, composer and biographer of Edward Elgar, was born in Christ Church Street in Frome in 1875.
 Kate Rew, author and wild swimmer.
 Christina Rossetti (poet, and sister of Dante Gabriel Rossetti), helped her mother run a day school in Frome in 1853–4. Commemorated by Frome Society for Local Study plaque.
 Elizabeth Singer Rowe (poet and devotional writer, first published by John Dunton). Commemorated by Frome Society for Local Study plaque.
 Henry Thomas Ryall, royal engraver to Queen Victoria, was born in Frome in 1811.
 John Webb Singer (1819–1904) was a bronze art founder and manufacturer of ecclesiastical metalwork.   He was born, worked and died in Frome.
 Emma Sheppard (1813–1871) was a writer and workhouse reformer who lived and was buried in Frome.
 Thomas Sheppard (1766–1858) was the first MP for Frome after the Reform Act of 1832.
 Mavis Tate, campaigner for women's rights, was Frome's only female MP from 1937 to 1945.
 Siobhan Thompson, sketch comedian and comedy writer, grew up in Frome.
 Betty Trask (1893–1983) writer of romance novels, lived and died in Frome
 Richard Vranch of Whose Line Is It Anyway? was born in Frome in 1959.
 Sir Charles Wilkins, the first translator of Bhagavad Gita into English, was born in Frome around 1749.
 Kerry Wilkinson, one of Amazon's top-10 best-selling authors worldwide for 2011, went to Oakfield Middle School and Frome Community College.

Twin towns
Frome has three twin towns: Château-Gontier in France, Murrhardt in Germany and Rabka-Zdrój in Poland.

Freedom of the Town
The following people have received the Freedom of the Town of Frome.
 

 Jenson Button: 4 May 2010.

References

Further reading
 Michael McGarvie, Frome Through the Ages: An Anthology in Prose and Verse, Frome Society for Local Study, Frome 2000, 
 John Payne (ed.), Working Memories; Frome workers tell their stories, Home in Frome with Millstream Books, Frome 2012, 
 Mick Davis and Valerie Pitt, The Historic Inns of Frome, Akleman Press, Bath 2015, 
 Michael McGarvie, Frome Street and Place-Names: Their Origin and Meaning, Frome Society for Local Study, Frome 2017, 
 Carolyn Griffiths, Woad to this & The Cloth Trade of Frome, Frome Society for Local Study, Frome 2017, 
 Mick Davis and David Lassman, The Awful Killing of Sarah Watts, Pen & Sword True Crime, Barnsley 2018,  – an account of Frome's most infamous murder and a companion book to The Suspicions of Mr Whicher by Kate Summerscale
 Mick Davis and David Lassman, Foul Deeds & Suspicious Deaths in & around Frome, Pen & Sword True Crime, Barnsley 2018, 
 Crysse Morrison, Frome Unzipped from Prehistory to Post-Punk, Hobnob Books, Gloucester 2018,

External links 

 Frome Town Council
 Discover Frome: visitor information, history & heritage
 Frome family and social history – David Smart, no longer updated
 
Frome Festival
Frome Children's Festival
The Frome Independent Market

 
Towns in Mendip District
Civil parishes in Somerset
Market towns in Somerset